Attar or Attoor may refer to:

People
Attar (name)
Fariduddin Attar, 12th-century Persian poet

Places
Attar (Madhya Pradesh), the location of Attar railway station, Madhya Pradesh, India
Attar, Iran, a village in Razavi Khorasan Province, Iran
Khalid Al Attar Tower 2, Dubai, UAE

Other uses
Attar (caste), a Muslim community in Maharashtra, India
ʿAṯtar, a western Semitic god
Ittar or attar, an essential oil derived from botanical sources
Attar of roses, essential oil extracted from the petals of various types of rose
Colonel Attar, a character in the movie Planet of the Apes
Attar (syrup), a type of sweet syrup

See also
 Atta (disambiguation)
 Athar (disambiguation)
 Attarwala